The 2018 BET Hip Hop Awards are a recognition ceremony held on October 16, 2018 at the Fillmore Miami Beach at Jackie Gleason Theater in Miami Beach, Florida.  The nominations were announced on September 9, 2018. 

Drake led the BET Hip-Hop Awards 2018 with eleven nominations, followed by Cardi B with ten. Under them  Childish Gambino received six nomination,  Travis Scott  and Kendrick Lamar tied for five nominations, and Jay-Z (credited also as "The Carters" with Beyoncé in Album of the Year, Best Collabo, Duo or Group and Song of the Year categories) with four nominations.

Cardi B was the biggest winner with four awards, including MVP of the Years and Hustler of the Year. Jay-Z and Beyoncé followed with three awards, including Album of the Year and Song of the Year. XXXTentacion was the winner of Best Hip Hop New Artist.  XXXTentacion's mother accepted his award on his behalf since he had been murdered months beforehand.

Cyphers 
Beat and mix by DJ Mustard. Mix #3 by Erykah Badu

Nominations and Winners
Winners highlighted in Bold

Best Hip Hop Video 
 Childish Gambino – "This Is America"
 Cardi B featuring Bad Bunny and J Balvin – "I Like It"
 Drake – "God's Plan"
 Kendrick Lamar featuring Rihanna – "Loyalty"
Migos featuring Drake – "Walk It Talk It"

Best Collabo, Duo or Group 
The Carters – "Apeshit"
21 Savage featuring Offset and Metro Boomin – "Ric Flair Drip"
BlocBoy JB featuring Drake – "Look Alive"
Cardi B featuring Bad Bunny and J Balvin – "I Like It"
Post Malone featuring 21 Savage – "Rockstar"

Hot Ticket Performer 

Childish Gambino
 Drake
Kendrick Lamar
Travis Scott

Lyricist of the Year 

Childish Gambino
 Drake
 J. Cole
Kendrick Lamar
Travis Scott

Video Director of the Year  

Benny Boom
Dave Meyers & The Little Homies
 Director X
 Eif Rivera
Hiro Murai
Karena Evans

DJ of the Year 

Calvin Harris
DJ Drama
 DJ Envy
DJ Khaled
 DJ Mustard

Producer of the Year 

 Ben Billions
 DJ Mustard
 DJ Esco
Metro Boomin
 Pharrell Williams

MVP of the Year 

Cardi B
Childish Gambino
Drake
Travis Scott
J. Cole

Single of the Year 
 "Apeshit" – Produced by Pharrell Williams (The Carters, Quavo and Offset)
 "God's Plan" – Produced by Cardo, Young Exclusive and Boi-1da (Drake)
 "I Like It" – Produced by  Craig Kallman, JWhiteDidIt and Tainy  (Cardi B featuring Bad Bunny and J Balvin)
 "Nice for What" – Produced by Murda Beatz (Drake)
"This Is America"  – Produced by Childish Gambino & Ludwig Göransson (Childish Gambino)

Album of the Year 

 Cardi B  – Invasion of Privacy
 Drake – Scorpion
 J. Cole –  KOD
 Migos – Culture II
 The Carters - Everything Is Love

Best New Hip Hop Artist 
Trippie Redd
BlocBoy JB
Juice Wrld
Lil Baby
Rich the Kid
XXXTentacion

Hustler of the Year 

Cardi B 
Drake
 DJ Khaled
 JAY-Z
 Kendrick Lamar
Travis Scott

Made-You-Look Award (Best Hip Hop Style)

Nicki Minaj
Remy Ma
 Migos
 Cardi B
Travis Scott

Best Mixtape 

BlocBoy JB– "Simi"
 Juicy J – "Shut Da F* Up"
Lil Wayne – "Dedication 6: Reloaded"
 Zoey Dollaz – "Sorry Not Sorry"
Future –" Beast Mode 2"

Sweet 16: Best Featured Verse 

21 Savage– "Bartier Cardi" (Cardi B featuring 21 Savage )
Cardi B– "MotorSport" (Migos featuring Cardi B and Nicki Minaj)
Drake– "Look Alive" (BlocBoy JB– featuring Drake)
Kendrick Lamar– "New Freezer" (Rich the Kid featuring Kendrick Lamar)
Nicki Minaj– "Big Bank" (YG feat. 2 Chainz, Big Sean & Nicki Minaj)

Impact Track 

Childish Gambino – "This Is America"
Dej Loaf & Leon Bridges – "Liberated"
Lecrae featuring Tori Kelly– "I'll Find You"
Meek Mill featuring Miguel – "Stay Woke "
N.E.R.D featuring Future  – "1000"

I Am Hip Hop Icon
Lil Wayne

References

BET Hip Hop Awards
2018 music awards